William Rogers House, also known as Tindal House, is a historic home located at Bishopville, Lee County, South Carolina.  It was built about 1845, and is a two-story, vernacular Greek Revival style house.  The front façade features a large two-story pedimented portico. This portico has four large square, frame columns with Doric order capitals.  William Rogers' grandson was Thomas G. McLeod, who served as South Carolina's governor from 1923 to 1927. During his childhood McLeod was a frequent visitor to this home.

It was added to the National Register of Historic Places in 1986.

References 

Houses on the National Register of Historic Places in South Carolina
Greek Revival houses in South Carolina
Houses completed in 1845
Houses in Lee County, South Carolina
National Register of Historic Places in Lee County, South Carolina